Rovira may refer to:
Rovira, Tolima, Colombia
Rovira, Chiriquí, Panama
Rovira (surname)